A dry run (or practice run) is a software testing process where the effects of a possible failure are intentionally mitigated. For example, there is rsync utility for transfer data over some interface (usually Ethernet), but user can try rsync with dry-run option to check syntax and test communication without data transferring.

The usage of "dry run" in acceptance procedures (for example in factory acceptance testing) is meant as following: the factory, which is a subcontractor, must perform a complete test of the system it has to deliver before the actual acceptance by customer.

Etymology
The term dry run appears to have originated from fire departments in the US. In order to practice, they would carry out dispatches of the fire brigade where water was not pumped. A run with real fire and water was referred to as a wet run. The more general usage of the term seems to have arisen from widespread use by the United States Armed Forces during World War II.

See also

Code review
Pilot experiment
Preview (computing)

References

External links

World Wide Words: Dry Run
Wiktionary - dry run

Tests
Software testing